is a Japanese voice actress from Hyōgo Prefecture. She is affiliated with the talent management firm 81 Produce.

Filmography

TV series
Wedding Peach (1995), Girl (ep 12)
You're Under Arrest (1996), Hiromi Shinohara (ep 9)
Detective Conan (1996), Ishiguro (ep 217)
Ganbarist! Shun (1996), female student (ep 2)
Pocket Monsters (1997), Botan
Kyuumei Senshi Nanosaver (1997), Kei
Weiß Kreuz (1998), Midori Hazuki (Ep. 20)
Serial Experiments Lain (1998), Alice Mizuki
His and Her Circumstances (1998), Music teacher (ep 14)
D4 Princess (1999), Aino Nozomi
Gregory Horror Show (1999), Roulette Boy
Ippatsu Kiki Musume (1999), Linda
Digimon Tamers (2001), D-Reaper, Juri Kato
Kokoro Library (2001), Raika Mizumoto (ep 10)
Digimon Frontier (2002), Plotmon
Kyo Kara Maoh! (2004), Roseno
Aria the Animation (2005), Akiko Hoshino (ep 12–13)
Koi suru Tenshi Angelique: Kokoro no Mezameru Toki (2006), Queen of Seijuu
Koi suru Tenshi Angelique: Kagayaki no, hita (2007), Queen/Angelique Collet

Original video animation (OVA)
Golden Boy (1995), Ayuko (young)
Cool Devices (1995), Cat Girl (Operation 3), Marino Ohkura (Operation 6), Minako (Operation 10)
My Dear Marie (1996), Mari
Ninja Cadets (1996), Inaba
Parade Parade (1996), Kaori Shiine, theme song performance
Alice in Cyberland (1997), Alice
Tournament of the Gods: Title Match (1997), Plumerock (ep 2), Receptionist (ep 1)
Pendant (1997)
Wild Cardz (1998), Casa Clover
Dragon Knight: The Wheel of Time (1998), Natasha, theme song performance
Mystery of the Necronomicon (1999), Asuka Kashiwagi
Dokyusei 2 Special: Sotsugyousei (1999), Sakurako Sugimoto
Angelique: Shiroi Tsubasa no Memoir (2000), Angelique Collet
éX-Driver (2000), Lorna Endou
Angelique: Seichi Yori Ai o Komete (2001), Angelique Collet

Film
éX-Driver the Movie (2002), Lorna Endou
Digimon Tamers: Runaway Locomon (2002), Juri Katou

Video games
Arc the Lad II (1996), Leeza
Lunar: Silver Star Story (1996), Mia Ausa
Ehrgeiz (1998), Tifa Lockhart (Arcade Version)
Princess Quest (1998), Will
Samurai Shodown: Warriors Rage (1999), Rinka Yoshino
Unison: Rebels of Rhythm & Dance (2000), Cela
Gregory Horror Show: Soul Collector (2003), Roulette Boy

Drama CD
Digimon Tamers Original Story: Message in the Packet (2003), Juri Katou
Digimon Tamers 2018: Days -Information and the Unordinary- (2018), Juri Katou

References

External links
 Official agency profile 
 Yōko Asada at GamePlaza-Haruka Voice Acting Database 
 Yōko Asada at Hitoshi Doi's Seiyuu Database
 

1969 births
Living people
Voice actresses from Hyōgo Prefecture
Japanese video game actresses
Japanese voice actresses
81 Produce voice actors
20th-century Japanese actresses
21st-century Japanese actresses